Pahuj River is a river flowing through the city of Jhansi, Uttar Pradesh, India. It has been referred as the Pushpavati in religious texts. It is a small and dry river which passes through the Indian Grassland and Fodder Research Institute, Jhansi. It flows through the region of Bundelkhand region and a plays a major part in dividing the border of Uttar Pradesh and Madhya Pradesh. Generally it flows at a heavy water level outside its banks in the monsoon season but drastically can also go dry or with very little flow in the summers. Nowadays many electric plants in Uttar pradesh are discharging its waste in it due to which the water of the river getting contaminated day by day and also illegal mining at the banks of it is causing its state deteriorating day by day. The river is approx 195 km from its origin to mouth.

Sources 
It originates near the hills of Jhansi or in Tikamgarh district of Madhya Pradesh.  It is a tributary of the Sindh River, which joins the Yamuna River in Etawah, just after the Chambal River confluence with the Yamuna river.

Dam 
Due to the construction of Pahuj dam near Jhansi, the river has increased its water level.

Rivers of Madhya Pradesh
Rivers of India